Baarlo may refer to several places in the Netherlands:

 Baarlo, a town in the southeast
 Baarlo, Steenwijkerland, a village in the east 
 Baarlo, Zwartewaterland, a village in the east

See also
 Baarle, a village spanning the Belgium–Netherlands border